Tales of Unrest is a collection of five works of short fiction by Polish-British author Joseph Conrad. Four of the five works were previously published as serials in literary journals before appearing in the volume, published in 1898 by T. Fisher Unwin.

Stories

All of the works in Tales of Unrest, except "The Return" were published as serials before being collected in 1898. The name of the literary journal and date appears after each title.

“The Idiots” (The Savoy, October 1896)
“An Outpost of Progress” (Cosmopolis, June–July 1897)
“The Lagoon” (The Cornhill Magazine, January 1897)
"Karain" (Blackwood’s Magazine, November 1897)
“The Return” (never appeared as a serial)

Critical Assessment

When Conrad’s first collection of short fiction appeared in 1898, he was already regarded "a writer of considerable standing and achievement" among critics, though "his popular appeal was limited".
Literary critic Albert J. Guerard places The Tales of Unrest among Conrad’s outstanding works produced between 1897 and 1907, and "the most astounding periods of creative energy in the career of any novelist".

Theme

Of the five stories that compose Tales of Unrest, four are concerned with destructive illusions, in which the protagonists suffer "the crippling nature of moral blindness". Literary critic Laurence Graver notes that while the word "return" appears at key moments in the stories, "no return, physical or metaphorical, is possible".

Footnotes

Sources 
Baines, Jocelyn. 1960. Joseph Conrad: A Critical Biography, McGraw-Hill Book Company, New York. 
Graver, Laurence. 1969. Conrad’s Short Fiction. University of California Press, Berkeley, California. 
Guerard, Albert J.. 1965. Conrad: The Novelist. Press, Cambridge, Massachusetts. LOC Catalog Card Number 58-8995.
 J.H. Stape, ed. The Cambridge Companion to Joseph Conrad, Cambridge University Press, 2006.
 Project Gutenberg  (plain text and HTML)

Joseph Conrad

External links
 
 

Short stories by Joseph Conrad
1898 short stories